Kyle Cone is an exposed volcanic cone near Cape Crozier, located  west-northwest of the summit of The Knoll in eastern Ross Island, Antarctica. It was named by the New Zealand Antarctic Place-Names Committee after Philip R. Kyle, a geologist with the Victoria University of Wellington Antarctic Expedition, which examined the cone in the 1969–70 season.

See also
 Kyle Peak

References

Volcanoes of Ross Island